Sandra Jaffe (March 10, 1938 - December 27, 2021) owned and operated Preservation Hall in New Orleans. She established Preservation Hall with her husband Allan Jaffe in 1961.

References

1938 births
2021 deaths
People from Philadelphia